The 2020 United States elections were held on Tuesday, November 3, 2020.  Democratic presidential nominee, former vice president Joe Biden, defeated incumbent Republican president Donald Trump in the presidential election. Despite losing seats in the House of Representatives, Democrats retained control of the House and gained control of the Senate. As a result, the Democrats obtained a government trifecta, the first time since the elections in 2008 that the party gained unified control of Congress and the presidency. With Trump losing his bid for re-election, he became the first defeated incumbent president to have overseen his party lose the presidency and control of both the House and the Senate since Herbert Hoover in 1932. This was the first time since 1980 that either chamber of Congress flipped partisan control in a presidential year, and the first time Democrats did so since 1948.

Biden became his party's nominee after defeating numerous challengers in the Democratic primaries, while Trump faced token opposition in the Republican primaries. In the congressional elections, Democrats lost seats in the House of Representatives but retained their majority in the chamber by a narrow margin. Democrats made a net gain of three seats in the Senate for a total of 50 seats, taking control of the chamber as newly elected vice-president Kamala Harris could cast tie-breaking votes. Contests for the six non-voting congressional delegates from the District of Columbia and the permanently inhabited U.S. territories were also held during the 2020 elections.

Regularly-scheduled elections were held in 86 of the 99 state legislative chambers, and 11 states held their gubernatorial elections. Only one state governorship and two legislative chambers changed partisan control, as Republicans won the gubernatorial race in Montana and gained control of both legislative chambers in New Hampshire. Various other state executive and judicial elections, as well as numerous referendums, tribal elections, mayoral elections, and other local elections, also took place in 2020. The 2020 elections were the last major set of elections to impact the redistricting cycle that will take place following the 2020 Census.
Significant issues for voters included the ongoing COVID-19 pandemic, as well as health care, the economy, racial unrest and climate change. Social distancing guidelines resulted in unprecedented levels of postal voting and early voting. Voter turnout greatly exceeded recent elections; one projection has turnout by voting eligible population being higher than any election since 1900. 

After Biden won the election, Trump and other Republicans refused to concede, making baseless and disproven claims of widespread voter fraud, despite U.S. election security officials saying that the election was "the most secure in American history". These attempts to overturn the election resulted in a deadly attack on the U.S. Capitol, which led to Trump being impeached for the second time and deplatformed across several major social media platforms.

Federal elections

Presidential election

The U.S. presidential election of 2020 was the 59th quadrennial U.S. presidential election, and was held to fill a term lasting from January 20, 2021 to January 20, 2025. By November 7, all major media organizations had projected that former vice president Joe Biden, the candidate of the Democratic Party, had defeated incumbent Republican president Donald Trump in the election. Based on the winner of the popular vote in each state, the Electoral College cast votes on December 14, and Congress counted the electoral votes and formally declared Biden as the election winner in a joint session on January 6, 2021. In the months after the election, Trump challenged the results of the election, but on January 7, following congressional certification of the electoral vote and the 2021 storming of the United States Capitol, Trump acknowledged that "a new administration will be inaugurated."

Biden won the election with 306 electoral votes and 51.3% of the national popular vote, compared to Trump's 232 electoral votes and 46.9% of the popular vote. Biden won every state that 2016 Democratic presidential nominee Hillary Clinton won in the 2016 presidential election, as well as Arizona, Georgia, Michigan, Pennsylvania, Wisconsin, and Nebraska's second congressional district. Biden won the tipping-point state, Wisconsin, by a margin of 0.6%. While Biden won the popular vote by 7 million votes, across Arizona, Georgia, and Wisconsin, the three states whose electoral votes contributed to Biden's win, Biden won by fewer than 45,000 votes. In California and New York, Biden received 7 million more votes than Trump, accounting for Biden's popular vote win. Among third party and independent candidates, Libertarian Party candidate Jo Jorgensen won 1.2% of the popular vote, Green Party candidate Howie Hawkins finished with 0.3% of the vote, and various other candidates won about 0.4% of the vote.

Incumbent Trump won re-nomination by his party after facing token opposition in the 2020 Republican primaries. The Republican Party also re-nominated Vice President Mike Pence as Trump's running mate for the 2020 election. Biden became the Democratic Party's presumptive nominee in early April 2020 after Bernie Sanders withdrew from the 2020 Democratic Party presidential primaries; Biden later chose Kamala Harris as his running mate shortly before the 2020 Democratic National Convention. Along with Biden and Sanders, Elizabeth Warren, Michael Bloomberg, Pete Buttigieg, Amy Klobuchar, and Tulsi Gabbard all won at least one delegate in the 2020 Democratic presidential primaries. Beyond the two major parties, about 1,200 individuals listed their names with the federal government as third party and independent candidates.

Biden is the oldest individual to win a US presidential election, and Kamala Harris is the first woman to be elected vice president of the US. Trump's defeat made him the first incumbent president to lose re-election since George H. W. Bush in the 1992 presidential election, and the tenth elected president to lose his re-election bid. He also became the first elected president to lose the popular vote twice since Benjamin Harrison in the late 19th century; and the first president ever to be elected while losing the popular vote, to then be impeached, and to then lose reelection as an incumbent. Accounting for the Democratic gain of the House in 2018, 2020 represented the first time since the 1930 and 1932 elections, as well as the sixth time overall, that an opposition party flipped control of the White House and both houses of Congress from the prior governing party following a single presidential term. Biden became the first U.S. presidential candidate to win over 80 million total votes, won the highest share of the popular vote of any challenger to an incumbent president since the 1932 presidential election, and won the popular vote by the largest margin since Barack Obama's victory in the 2008 presidential election. The Democratic victory in the national popular vote marked the seventh time in eight elections that Democrats won the national popular vote, although Republicans won the majority of the electoral vote (and thus the election) in three of those eight elections.

Congressional elections

Senate elections

Thirty-five of the 100 seats in the United States Senate were up for election in 2020: all 33 seats of Senate Class II, and seats in Arizona and Georgia that were up for special elections. Republicans defended 23 seats, while Democrats defended 12 seats. Prior to the 2020 election, and including seats not up for election, Republicans held 53 Senate seats, while Democrats held 45 seats, and Democratic-aligned independents held the remaining two seats. Because the vice president has the casting vote in the Senate, Democrats needed to achieve a net gain of at least three seats to achieve control if they won the vice presidency; otherwise, they needed to achieve a net gain of at least four seats to take the majority.

Five seats changed partisan control in the 2020 elections, as Democrats defeated both Republican incumbents in Georgia, as well as the Republican incumbents in the seats up in Arizona and Colorado. Republicans picked up one seat by defeating the Democratic incumbent in Alabama. The results of the 2020 cycle left both partisan caucuses with 50 senators. Democrats gained majority control of the Senate on January 20, 2021, when Vice President-elect Harris and senators Alex Padilla, Jon Ossoff, and Raphael Warnock were sworn into office. Democrats gained control of the Senate for the first time since they lost control in the 2014 United States Senate elections.

House of Representatives elections

All 435 voting seats in the United States House of Representatives were up for election; 218 seats are necessary for a majority. The winners of each race serve a two-year term. Democrats had gained control of the House of Representatives in the 2018 elections, winning 235 seats compared to 199 seats for Republicans. Due to vacancies and party-switching that arose during the 116th Congress, immediately before the November 2020 elections Democrats held 232 seats, compared to 197 seats held by Republicans and one seat, that of Justin Amash, held by the Libertarian Party. Thus, Republicans needed to gain 21 seats to gain a majority.

Republicans picked up 14 seats in the House elections, defeating thirteen incumbent House Democrats. Nationally, Democratic House candidates won by a margin of about 3%, as many Democrats ran behind Biden. The election results left Democrats with a narrow majority of 222 seats at the start of the 117th Congress.

Special elections

Five special elections were held in 2020 to replace a member who resigned or died in office during the 116th U.S. Congress:

 California's 25th congressional district: Republican Mike Garcia defeated Democrat Christy Smith to replace Democrat Katie Hill who, on October 27, 2019, announced her intent to resign in the wake of ethics concerns surrounding a relationship with a staffer. The district has an even partisan index.
 Georgia's 5th congressional district: Democrat Kwanza Hall defeated Democrat Robert Michael Franklin Jr. to succeed Democrat John Lewis after his death from pancreatic cancer on July 17, 2020. The district has a partisan index of D+34.
 Maryland's 7th congressional district: Democrat Kweisi Mfume defeated Republican Kimberly Klacik to replace Democrat Elijah Cummings, who died in office on October 17, 2019. The district has a partisan index of D+26.
 New York's 27th congressional district: Republican Chris Jacobs defeated Democrat Nate McMurray to succeed Republican Chris Collins, who resigned from Congress on October 1, 2019, ahead of his pleading guilty to insider trading. The district has a partisan index of R+11.
 Wisconsin's 7th congressional district: Republican Tom Tiffany defeated Democrat Tricia Zunker to replace Republican Sean Duffy, who announced his resignation effective September 23, 2019, ahead of the birth of his ninth child, who was diagnosed in utero with severe medical complications. The district has a partisan index of R+7.

State elections

Gubernatorial

Elections were held for the governorships of 11 U.S. states and two U.S. territories. Most elections were for four-year terms, but the governors of New Hampshire and Vermont each serve two-year terms. Republicans defended a total of seven seats, while Democrats defended six seats. Only one state governorship changed parties, as Republican Greg Gianforte won the 2020 Montana gubernatorial election, succeeding outgoing Democratic Governor Steve Bullock. In Puerto Rico, the governorship was retained by the New Progressive Party, although the winning candidate, Pedro Pierluisi, is affiliated with the Democratic Party, replacing an incumbent who was affiliated with the Republican Party.

Legislative
Regularly-scheduled elections were held in 86 of the 99 state legislative chambers in the United States; nationwide, regularly-scheduled elections were held for 5,876 of the 7,383 legislative seats. Many legislative chambers had all legislative seats up for election, but some legislative chambers that use staggered elections held elections for only a portion of the total seats in the chamber. Although most states held regularly-scheduled elections for both legislative chambers, Alabama, Louisiana, Maryland, Mississippi, New Jersey and Virginia did not hold state legislative elections, and Michigan held elections only for the lower house. Nebraska, the only state that does not have a bicameral state legislature, held elections for half of the seats in its lone legislative chamber.

A total of two legislative chambers changed partisan control in 2020, as Republicans gained control of both chambers in New Hampshire. This represented the fewest partisan changes in state legislatures since 1944.

Prior to the November 2020 elections, Democrats held 15 "trifectas" (control of the governor's office and both legislative chambers), Republicans held 20 trifectas, and 14 states have a divided government. Not included in this tally is Nebraska, as its legislature officially recognizes no party affiliations. Nationwide, Republicans controlled approximately 60 percent of the legislative chambers and 52 percent of the legislative seats. The 2020 elections created two new trifectas, as the New Hampshire and Montana state government shifted from divided government to Republican control.

Attorney General 

Regularly-scheduled elections were held in 10 of 43 states that elect attorneys general. The previous attorney general elections for this group of states took place in 2016, except in Vermont where attorneys general only serve two-year terms and last elected their current attorney general in 2018. Nine state attorneys general ran for re-election and eight won, while Republican Tim Fox of Montana could not run again due to term limits and Republican Curtis Hill of Indiana was eliminated in the Republican convention.

No attorneys general offices changed party control in 2020.

Other state elections

In 2020, 82 state supreme court seats are up for election in 35 states. This constitutes 24% of all state supreme court seats in the country. Various other state courts will also hold elections in 2020. Various state executive positions are also up for election in 2020.

Referendums and ballot measures

In the 2020 elections, voters considered a number of referendums, initiatives, ballot measures, and state constitutional amendments on a variety of topics, ranging from Medicaid expansion to marijuana legalization to voting rights. Since the murder of George Floyd and subsequent protests, there were at least 20 police-related ballot measures across the country, including in California, Illinois, Ohio, Oregon, Pennsylvania, Texas, and Washington.

 In the 2020 Puerto Rican status referendum, Puerto Ricans decisively voted for statehood; the measure was nonbinding (since only Congress may admit a state to the Union) but was a significant step forward in Puerto Rico's effort to become a state.
 Four states legalized marijuana for recreational use: New Jersey, South Dakota, Montana (Montana I-190), and Arizona (Proposition 207). The measures passed by broad margins.
 Oregon became the first U.S. state to decriminalize possession of small amounts of "harder drugs" such as cocaine, heroin, or methamphetamine, making possession a civil violation rather than a criminal offense. The measure also directed revenue raised from marijuana sales taxes to drug addiction treatment.
 Oregon also became the first state to legalize the use of psychedelic mushrooms, with Measure 109 passing with 56% of the vote. The measure allows the regulated use of psychedelic mushrooms by adults over the age of 21 in supervised, therapeutic settings, and requires secure storage at licensed facilities.
 Alabama, Colorado, and Florida voters passed state constitutional amendments narrowing the right to vote in elections by replacing language in the state constitution stating "every citizen" has the right to vote with "only a citizen." These measures had no practical impact since non-citizens were not permitted to vote in U.S. elections before the measures were adopted.
 Colorado voters decided to keep the state in the National Popular Vote Interstate Compact by a 52-to-48 margin, rejecting a repeal effort.
 Voters in Rhode Island decided to remove "and Providence Plantations" from the state's official name.
 In California, voters rejected Proposition 16, a measure to repeal the state ban on affirmative action. 
 In California, Proposition 22 passed with 58% of the vote; the measure, which was backed by $200 million from Uber/Postmates, Lyft, DoorDash, and Instacart, reversed a recently passed state law requiring those companies to treat "gig economy" workers as employees (entitled to the full array of employee benefits) rather than as independent contractors.
 In California, Proposition 25, a veto referendum, passed by broad margins, thus nullifying a state bill that would have replaced cash bail with risk assessments for suspects detained pending trial.
 In Mississippi voters overwhelmingly approved a new state flag, replacing the former divisive state flag, which included the Confederate battle flag. 
 Missouri voters approved an initiative amending their state constitutions to expand Medicaid under the Patient Protection and Affordable Care Act, circumventing the Republican-dominated state legislature, which had refused to do so. The Missouri constitutional amendment will expand Medicaid access to a quarter-million more adults starting in July 2021.
 Michigan voters approved a legislatively referred state constitutional amendment prohibiting the unreasonable search and seizure of electronic data and electronic communications and requiring state and local police to obtain a search warrant before searching electronic data. The measure, passed with 89% of the vote. Michigan became the 13th state to include privacy protections in a state constitution, and the third state to add such protection by ballot measure.
 Maryland voters approved by a 2-1 margin, a ballot measure to legalize sports betting at stadiums and casinos, with tax proceeds benefiting K-12 public schools; the vote made Maryland the 18th state to legalize sports betting.
 Ballot measures to remove "penal exceptions" from state constitutional prohibitions on slavery (language that allowed slavery as a criminal punishment) passed in Nebraska and Utah, with about 68% and 80% of the vote, respectively. These unenforceable and obsolete provisions were once used for convict leasing and forced prisoner labor.
 Maine voters, in the March 2020 primary ballot, rejected (by a wide margin) a veto referendum that sought to overturn a new Maine state law that eliminated religious and philosophical exemptions from mandatory vaccinations for K-12 and college students and employees of healthcare facilities. 
 Alaska voters narrowly approved an initiative to replace partisan primaries with top-four open primaries and ranked-choice voting for state, federal, and presidential level.
 In Florida, a proposed state constitutional amendment to establish open "jungle primaries" (also called "top-two" primaries), with the top two vote-getters advancing to the November ballot irrespective of party) was defeated; 57% voted to approve, short of the three-fifths (60%) vote required.
 Massachusetts voters rejected Question 2, an initiative to implement ranked-choice voting for future state elections, with about 55% voting against the question. Massachusetts voters approved Question 1 with a 75% "yes" vote, extending the "right to repair" to certain vehicles, extending 2012 legislation and consumers' rights to obtain telematics data.
 Illinois voted against the Illinois Fair Tax, a proposed state amendment championed by Governor J.B. Pritzker, which, had it passed, would have changed the state income tax system from a flat tax to a graduated income tax.
 Georgia approved, by wide margins, ballot questions that aimed to make funds collected from taxes and fees used for their intended projects (passed with 82% of the vote); waived sovereign immunity in cases alleging unconstitutionality of a law; and exempting certain charities from property tax.
 Florida, Arkansas and North Dakota voters defeated legislatively-referred measures which would have restricted the ability of citizens to place questions on the ballot or added hurdles to enacting laws via ballot measure. In Florida, voters defeated a measure would have required voters to pass future state constitutional amendments by 60% in two successive elections (rather than one election) in order for the amendment to be adopted. On North Dakota, voters defeated a measure would have required future successful citizen-initiated constitutional amendments to be sent to the legislature for further approval, and would refer those which failed to get legislative approval back to the ballot in the next general election; In Arkansas, voters defeated Issue 3, a measure would have required future ballot initiatives to gain half of the required petition signatures from each of 45 counties instead of the current 15 counties and also raised the threshold for the legislature to place a proposed constitutional amendment on the ballot from a simple majority of both chambers to three-fifths vote of both chambers.

Several proposed referendums failed to secure the necessary number of signatures to appear on ballots due to disruptions and social distancing measures undertaken after the COVID-19 pandemic. These included an effort in Ohio to raise the state's hourly minimum wage from $8.70 to $13; an anti-gerrymandering efforts in Oklahoma and Arkansas; and a California effort to allow electronic signatures for future California ballot measures.

Impact on redistricting

Following the 2020 United States Census, the state delegations to the U.S. House of Representatives will undergo reapportionment, and both the U.S. House of Representatives and the state legislatures will undergo redistricting. In states without redistricting commissions, the legislators and governors elected between 2017 and 2020 will draw the new congressional and state legislative districts that will take effect starting with the 2022 elections. State supreme courts can also have a significant effect on redistricting, as demonstrated in states such as Pennsylvania and Virginia. Thus the 2020 elections had a significant impact on the 2020 United States redistricting cycle. Barring court orders or mid-decade redistricting, the districts drawn in the redistricting cycle will remain in place until the next round of redistricting begins in 2030.

In the 2020 elections, the Republican Party won several legislative chambers and gubernatorial positions that had been selected by Democrats as key redistricting targets. Republicans flipped control of the New Hampshire legislature, defended the governorship of Missouri, retained control of both legislative chambers in Iowa, North Carolina, and Texas, and gained a super-majority in both chambers of the Kansas legislature, giving the party control of the key redistricting institutions in those states. Republicans also retained control of the Pennsylvania legislature and Minnesota Senate, ensuring divided partisan control of redistricting in both states. Additionally, the passage of a referendum in Virginia removed control of redistricting from the Democratic-controlled legislature to an independent commission. However, in New York, Democrats gained a two-thirds super-majority in the State Senate and held their super-majority in the State Assembly, giving the party full control of redistricting.

Territorial elections

The U.S. territories of American Samoa and Puerto Rico held gubernatorial and legislative elections in 2020, while Guam, the Northern Mariana Islands, and the U.S. Virgin Islands held legislative elections. Along with Washington, D.C., each territory also held elections for a non-voting delegate to the U.S. House of Representatives. All non-voting delegates serve two-year terms, with the exception of the Resident Commissioner of Puerto Rico, a non-voting position with a four-year term. Washington, D.C., also held elections for its shadow representative and one of its two shadow senators. The five territories also took part in the 2020 Democratic Party presidential primaries and the 2020 Republican Party presidential primaries.

Local elections

Mayoral elections
Since the beginning of 2020, various major cities have seen incumbent mayors re-elected, including Bakersfield (Karen Goh), Fremont (Lily Mei), and Sacramento, California (Darrell Steinberg); Baton Rouge, Louisiana (Sharon Weston Broome); Chesapeake (David West), Fairfax City (David Meyer), Fredericksburg (Mary Katherine Greenlaw), Hampton (Donnie Tuck), Richmond (Levar Stoney), and Virginia Beach, Virginia (Bobby Dyer); Glendale (Jerry Weiers), Mesa (John Giles), and Phoenix, Arizona (Kate Gallego); Irving (Rick Stopfer) and Lubbock, Texas (Dan Pope); Milwaukee, Wisconsin (Tom Barrett); Portland, Oregon (Ted Wheeler); Salt Lake County, Utah (Jenny Wilson); Wilmington, Delaware (Mike Purzycki); Winston-Salem, North Carolina (Allen Joines); and Bayamón, Puerto Rico (Ramón Luis Rivera Jr.).

In Norfolk, Virginia, Mayor Kenny Alexander was unopposed in seeking reelection, as was Mayor John Cruz in Hagåtña, Guam. In Tulsa, Oklahoma, incumbent mayor G. T. Bynum earned reelection by winning an outright majority in the August primary.

Open mayoral seats were won in Clearwater (Frank Hibbard) and Miami-Dade County, Florida (Daniella Levine Cava); Fresno (Jerry Dyer), Riverside (Patricia Lock Dawson), San Diego (Todd Gloria), and Santa Ana, California (Vicente Sarmiento); Gilbert (Brigette Peterson) and Scottsdale, Arizona (David Ortega); Honolulu, Hawaii (Rick Blangiardi); and San Juan, Puerto Rico (Miguel Romero).

In Baltimore, Maryland, city council president Democrat Brandon Scott was elected to replace incumbent Democrat Jack Young who came in fifth in a crowded primary. In Stockton, California, Kevin Lincoln defeated one-term incumbent mayor Michael Tubbs, who was first Black mayor of the city and the youngest person elected to the position when he unseated incumbent mayor Anthony Silva in 2016. In Texas, two mayoral runoff elections in December saw incumbents defeated: In Corpus Christi, city councilwoman Paulette Guajardo defeated incumbent Joe McComb, and in El Paso, former mayor Oscar Leeser unseated one-term incumbent Dee Margo. In Ely, Minnesota, Eric Urbas defeated three-term incumbent mayor Chuck Novack despite Urbas having dropped out of the race in August. In Rabbit Hash, Kentucky, incumbent Brynneth Pawltro was ousted by Wilbur Beast, a 6-month-old French bulldog. The town has never had a human mayor; Pawltro is a pit bull terrier.

Mayoral recalls
Several mayors faced recall campaigns during 2020. Mayors in Broken Bow, Nebraska; Diamond City, Arkansas; Heyburn, Idaho; and Oregon City, Oregon, were removed from office. Mayors in Elizabeth and Idaho Springs, Colorado; Humboldt, Nebraska; Powers, Oregon; Stevensville, Montana; and Westminster, California were retained in office.

Other elections and referendums
 More than a dozen cities and counties voted on police reform and accountability measures, including referendums creating new police civilian review boards, strengthening the oversight powers of existing boards (such as granting subpoena powers), requiring the public disclosure of body-camera video after incidents of police use of force, and allocating police funding to community initiatives. Most of the ballot questions passed, including measures in Oakland, San Francisco, San Diego, San Jose, and Sonoma County in California; King County, Washington; Portland, Oregon; Kyle, Texas; and Philadelphia and Pittsburgh, Pennsylvania.
 Voters in Washington, D.C., re-elected shadow senator Paul Strauss and elected Oye Owolewa as its shadow representative. These shadow positions are charged with lobbying Congress for D.C. statehood.
 D.C. voters approved Initiative 81, an initiative that designated the enforcement of laws against entheogens (psychedelics), including psilocybin mushrooms, peyote, and ayahuasca, as "among the Metropolitan Police Department's lowest law enforcement priorities." The measure passed with 76% of the vote.

Tribal elections
A number of Native American tribal governments held elections for tribal leadership in 2020. As with other elections in the country, the coronavirus pandemic disrupted many elections, delaying primaries and shifting some voting from in-person to postal.

The Fort McDowell Yavapai Nation reelected President Bernadine Burnette; the Sault Ste. Marie Tribe of Chippewa Indians reelected Tribal Chairman Aaron A. Payment; Oneida Nation of Wisconsin reelected Chairman Tehassi Hill; the Bois Forte Band of Chippewa reelected Tribal Chair Cathy Chavers; the Wichita and Affiliated Tribes reelected President Terri Parton; the Sitka Tribe of Alaska reelected Tribal Chairman Lawrence "Woody" Widmark; and incumbent Tribal Chief Donald (Doc) Slyter was unopposed in seeking reelection to lead the Confederated Tribes of Coos, Lower Umpqua and Siuslaw Indians. Stephanie Bryan, the first woman to serve as chair of the Poarch Band of Creek Indians, also won reelection. United Keetoowah Band of Cherokee Indians incumbent Tribal Chief Joe Bunch, who was impeached but not removed from office in January 2020, was re-elected.

In a runoff election, former South Dakota state senator Kevin Killer defeated incumbent Oglala Lakota Tribe president Julian Running Bear, who made the runoff by a single vote after surviving an impeachment effort in September. Crow Nation Senator Frank White Clay defeated incumbent tribal chairman A.J. Not Afraid Jr. Kristopher Peters was elected Squaxin Island Tribe tribal council chairman, defeating incumbent Arnold Cooper, and Joseph Tali Byrd defeated long-time Quapaw Nation Business Committee Chairman John Berrey. Durell Cooper defeated incumbent Apache Tribe of Oklahoma Tribal Chairman Bobby Komardley. Walter R. Echo-Hawk was unopposed in a special election for president of the Pawnee Nation of Oklahoma Business Council following the April 2020 recall of the prior president, James Whiteshirt. The Shakopee Mdewakanton Sioux Community elected Keith Anderson tribal chairman, replacing the retiring Charlie Vig.

Three Minnesota Chippewa Tribe bands had candidates win more than 50% of the votes in June primaries, eliminating the need for a general election: Leech Lake Band of Ojibwe incumbent tribal chair Faron Jackson Sr., White Earth Nation incumbent chief executive Michael Fairbanks, and, on the Grand Portage Indian Reservation, challenger Bobby Deschampe, who defeated incumbent tribal chair Beth Drost.

Northern Cheyenne voters elected five women to the tribal council, along with electing Donna Marie Fisher as tribal president and Serena Wetherelt as vice president. It is the first time women will make up the majority on the Northern Cheyenne tribal council.

Tribal referendums
 In March, the Oglala Lakota Tribe approved a referendum allowing medical and recreational marijuana while also opposing a referendum allowing alcohol sales at the Prairie Wind Casino on the Pine Ridge Reservation.
 In July, Oneida Nation of Wisconsin voters approved a referendum supporting a long-range Oneida language initiative.
 In October, the Yurok Tribe narrowly approved a referendum supporting establishment of a cannabis marketplace on tribal land.

Impact of the COVID-19 pandemic

Starting in March 2020, elections across the United States were delayed and disrupted by the COVID-19 pandemic. Numerous states delayed presidential primaries, while Alabama delayed the Republican primary Senatorial run-off and North Carolina and Mississippi delayed Republican primary run-off for congressional seats. Iowa, Missouri, South Carolina, and Texas all delayed municipal elections, and in New York City the special election for Queens borough president was cancelled. The pandemic also led to the postponement of the 2020 Democratic National Convention, and both the 2020 Democratic National Convention and the 2020 Republican National Convention were held virtually.

To help enforce social distancing, many states expanded absentee and vote-by-mail options for 2020 primary elections and the November general elections. Several elections, including Democratic primaries in Alaska and Hawaii, as well as the Maryland 7th congressional district special election, were conducted entirely with mail-in ballots only.

While the pandemic was impacting a number of things in elections 2020, Donald Trump was reported of planning to host his Election Night party at the White House. Two officials informed that Trump was planning a large indoor party of nearly 400 people at the East Room. The Trump Hotel on Pennsylvania Avenue was initially chosen as the venue, but this was later changed due to the coronavirus restrictions that limited such gatherings to 50 people.

Turnout

With many states easing rules on early voting in the midst of the COVID-19 pandemic, the 2020 election saw an unprecedented rate of early voting. By October 26, with eight days remaining until the election, the total early vote throughout the United States had eclipsed that of 2016. In total, about 100 million voters cast early votes, compared to the approximately 57 million early votes cast in 2016. Democrats disproportionately voted by mail, while Republicans tended to vote more frequently in person.

Just under 160 million people voted in the 2020 elections, compared to a turnout of approximately 137 million in the 2016 presidential election. Michael McDonald projects that about 67% of the voting eligible population voted in 2020, the highest rate of voter participation since the 1900 election. The 2020 elections saw the highest rate of voter participation by voting eligible population since the ratification of the Nineteenth Amendment, which prohibits denial of the right to vote on the basis of gender, the Voting Rights Act of 1965, which prohibits racial discrimination in voting, and the Twenty-sixth Amendment, which effectively lowered the national voting age from 21 to 18.

Public perceptions and analysis
In a poll conducted in 2019, 59% of respondents expressed that they are not confident in the "honesty of U.S. elections". In an August 2020 survey, 49% of respondents said that they expect voting to be "difficult", up from 15% in 2018; 75% of Republicans, but less than half of Democrats were confident that the elections "will be conducted fairly and accurately". In an October 2020 survey, 47% of respondents disagreed with the statement that the election "is likely to be fair and honest", 51% would not "generally agree on who is the legitimately elected president of the United States"; 56% said that they expect "an increase in violence as a result of the election". 49% of college students polled in September 2020 said that the elections won't be "fair and open", 55% that "it will not be administered well", and 81% that "special interest groups have more influence over election outcomes than voters".

According to an October 2020 poll, eight out of ten Americans consider misinformation a "major problem"; Biden supporters were more likely than Trump supporters to trust the news media and their candidate's messaging.

Historian Timothy Snyder, an expert on authoritarianism, said that "it's important not to talk about this as just an election. It's an election surrounded by the authoritarian language of a coup d'etat. [...] [Trump] seems pretty sure he won't win the election, [but] he doesn't want to leave the office." According to Snyder, in order to overcome Trump's "authoritarian's instinct", the opposition "has to win the election and it has to win the aftermath of the election."

According to political scientist Gary C. Jacobson, "The 2020 elections extended several long-term trends in American electoral politics that were driven to new extremes by the singularly divisive person and presidency of Donald J. Trump. The election set new records for electoral continuity, party loyalty, nationalization, polarization, and presidential influence on the down-ballot vote choices, to the point where local factors such as incumbency, candidate quality, and campaign spending barely registered in the congressional election results."

Issues
During the campaign, the most prominent issues were the COVID-19 pandemic, health care, economy, race, and abortion. Democrats emphasized coronavirus economic relief and public health measures such as contact tracing, face mask usage, and social distancing, whereas Republican downplayed the coronavirus, scuttled coronavirus economic relief negotiations in the lead-up to the election, and advocated for laxer public health measures to deal with the spread of the coronavirus. Trump himself held events across the country, including in coronavirus hotspots, where attendees did not wear masks and were not socially distancing; at the same time, he mocked those who wore face masks.

The Republican Party opted not to provide a comprehensive platform of its policy positions for the election; the 2020 platform was a one-page resolution which stated that the party "has and will continue to enthusiastically support the president's America-first agenda." Democrats ran on protecting and expanding the Affordable Care Act, while criticizing Republicans for jeopardizing protections for individuals with preexisting conditions. Republicans generally did not emphasize health care issues, as their opposition to the Affordable Care Act had become a political liability by 2020, as the legislation had grown in popularity.

On the environment, Democrats proposed plans to combat climate change, including through investments in renewable energy and rejoining the Paris Climate Accords, whereas Republicans emphasized increased production of oil and natural gas.

During the election campaign, Democrats made calls for criminal justice reform and spoke of a need to reduce systemic racism in the criminal justice system. Republicans ran on a "law and order" and pro-police messaging. While Democrats in many races were moderate, Republicans depicted them as extremists or secret "socialists" who held radical views on criminal justice or climate legislation.

The rhetoric of Trump and his allies during the election campaign was marked by frequent use of falsehoods and promotion of unfounded conspiracy theories. In the lead-up to the elections, Republicans attacked voting rights and spread falsehoods about voter fraud. Trump refused to commit to a peaceful transition of power in case he lost the election. While senior Republicans disapproved of Trump's rhetoric in private, they refused to rebuke him publicly.

Table of state, territorial, and federal results

This table shows the partisan results of president, congressional, gubernatorial, and state legislative races held in each state and territory in 2020. Note that not all states and territories held gubernatorial, state legislative, and U.S. Senate elections in 2020. The five territories and Washington, D.C., do not elect members of the U.S. Senate, and the territories do not take part in presidential elections; instead, they each elect one non-voting member of the House. Nebraska's unicameral legislature and the governorship and legislature of American Samoa are elected on a non-partisan basis and therefore political party affiliation is not listed.

See also
 Attempts to overturn the 2020 United States presidential election
Russian interference in the 2020 United States elections
 Voter suppression in the United States, 2019–2020

Notes

References

Further reading
 
 
 
 
 
 . (Photos depicting printing of paper ballots)

External links

 
 
 

 
Articles containing video clips
2020
Impact of the COVID-19 pandemic on politics
November 2020 events in the United States